Gwalior Light Railway (GLR) or Maharaja Railway was a  narrow-gauge railway network in Gwalior. It was set up for Gwalior State during the times of British India. Until its closure in 2020, the railway was the longest  gauge railway in the world.

History 

The Gwalior Light Railway was built by the Maharaja Madho Rao Scindia of the Gwalior State. It was originally a 14-mile long private tramway. Construction began in 1895 of the 53 mile Gwalior–Bhind line. By 1897 it was 34 miles long and was used to bring in supplies to relieve the famine. Both this section and the Gwalior–Shivpuri section opened on 2 December 1899 by Lord Curzon the Viceroy of India. The Gwalior-Joura branch opened on 1 January 1904 and on 12 January 1904 the extension to Sabalgarh was opened. A further extension to Birpur opened on 1 November 1908 and the full line to Sheopur opened on 15 June 1909. In October 1900, the Indian Midland Railway Company agreed to operate the railway on behalf of the Maharaja.

In 1942, the Gwalior Light Railway was renamed the Scindia State Railway. In 1951, the system was purchased by the Central Railway.

The railway was initially worked with steam locomotives, but later diesel locomotives were used. There was a plan to electrify the railway in the 1920s from a generating station below the Nanakura Dam, but this scheme was abandoned.

Permanent way 
The track was  flat-bottomed steel rails laid on a mix of Sal wood and iron sleepers.

Locomotives

Rolling stock
In 1936, the company owned 28 locomotives, 90 coaches and 363 goods wagons.

Classification
It was labeled as a Class III railway according to Indian Railway Classification System of 1926.

Conversion to broad gauge
The Gwalior–Bhind section and the Gwalior–Shivpuri section were converted to  broad gauge in the early 2010s. The Gwalior–Sheopur Kalan section is under conversion to  broad gauge as of 2020.

See also
 Nizam's Guaranteed State Railway

References

Transport in Gwalior
2 ft gauge railways in India
Defunct railway companies of India
Railway lines opened in 1899
History of Gwalior
1899 establishments in India
2020 disestablishments in India
Railway lines closed in 2020